The following notable people are or have been associated with Madison, Wisconsin.

Artists and architects

 Ruth Ball, sculptor
 Homer Fieldhouse, landscape architect
 Georgia O'Keeffe, artist; born in a suburb Sun Prairie and attended high school in Madison at Sacred Heart Academy, now Edgewood High School of the Sacred Heart
 Vinnie Ream, sculptor of the statue of Lincoln in the U.S. Capitol rotunda
 Steve Rude, comic book artist
 Maria Schneider, illustrator
 Simon Sparrow, mixed media artist
 Michael Velliquette, artist
 Frank Lloyd Wright, architect

Athletes and sports figures

 Frank Baker, NFL player
 Jim Bakken, NFL player
 Peter Barrett, Olympic gold medalist
 Ed Barry, MLB player
 Sam Barry, head coach of the Iowa Hawkeyes men's basketball team and USC Trojans men's basketball, baseball, and football teams; member of the Naismith Memorial Basketball Hall of Fame
 Les Bartholomew, MLB player
 Marc Behrend, NHL player
 Henry Benn, baseball player
 Dave Besteman, Olympic athlete
 Sandy Botham, head coach of the University of Wisconsin–Milwaukee Panthers women's basketball team
 Gene Brabender, MLB player for the Los Angeles Dodgers, Baltimore Orioles and the Seattle Pilots/Milwaukee Brewers
 Art Bramhall, MLB player
 Tyrone Braxton, NFL player
 Alex Brooks, NHL player
 Craig Brown, national champion curler
 Erika Brown, national champion curler
 Bob Bruer, NFL player
 Roman Brumm, NFL player
 Adam Burish, NHL player
 John Byce, NHL player
 Gabe Carimi, All-American football player
 Connie Carpenter-Phinney, road cyclist and ice speed skater; winner of first-ever women's Olympic road race (1984)
 Charlie Chech, MLB player
 Bruce Christensen, MLB player
 Geep Chryst, quarterbacks coach of the San Francisco 49ers
 Paul Chryst, former head coach of the University of Wisconsin football team
 Rick Chryst, commissioner of the Mid-American Conference, 1999–2009
 John Coatta, NFL scout
 Eddie Cochems, "father of the forward pass"
 Bill Cofield, head coach of the Wisconsin Badgers men's basketball team; first African American head coach of a major sport in the Big Ten Conference; 1976–1982
 Bill Collins, NFL player
 Casey Cramer, NFL player
 Annabelle Cripps, Olympic athlete
 Kevin Dean, NHL player
 Dorcas Denhartog, Olympic athlete
 Mary Docter, Olympic athlete
 Sarah Docter, Olympic athlete
 Clarence Esser, NFL player
 Paul Feldhausen, professional football player
 Casey FitzRandolph, Olympic gold medalist
 Mary Froning, AAGPBL player
 Steve Furniss, Olympic medalist, Pan American Games gold medalist
 Reece Gaines, NBA player for the Orlando Magic, Houston Rockets, and the Milwaukee Bucks
 Vern Geishert, MLB player
 Gale Gillingham, NFL player
 Mike Gosling, professional baseball player
 Carie Graves, Olympic gold medalist, head coach of the Harvard Crimson and Texas Longhorns women's crew teams
 Steve Green, NBA player
 Paul Gruber, NFL player
 Dale Hackbart, NFL player for the Green Bay Packers, Washington Redskins, Minnesota Vikings, St. Louis Cardinals, and the Denver Broncos
 Donald Hayes, NFL player
 Beth Heiden, Olympic speedskater
 Eric Heiden, Olympic speedskater
 Russell Hellickson, Olympic wrestler
 Phil Hellmuth, professional poker player
 Jack Ikegwuonu, NFL player
 Dan Immerfall, Olympic medalist, head referee for the International Skating Union, member of National Speedskating Hall of Fame
 Mark Johnson, 1980 Miracle on Ice USA Olympic hockey team gold medalist, NHL player
 Nicole Joraanstad, national champion curler
 Tim Jordan, NFL player
 Jerry Kelly, professional golfer
 Amanda Kessel, Olympic gold medalist in women's ice hockey and NWHL player for the Metropolitan Riveters
 Phil Kessel, NHL player for the Vegas Golden Knights
 Gordon King, NFL player
 George Kittle, NFL player for the San Francisco 49ers
 Phyllis Koehn, AAGPBL player
 Scott Kooistra, NFL player
 Joe Kurth, NFL player
 Dan Lanphear, professional football player
 Debi Laszewski, IFBB professional bodybuilder
 Mike London, professional football player
 Helene Madison, won three gold medals at the 1932 Olympics in swimming
 Wesley Matthews, basketball player
 Greg Mattison, NFL coach
Jeronne Maymon (born 1991), basketball player for Hapoel Eilat B.C. of the Israeli Basketball Premier League
 Dave McClain, head coach of the Ball State Cardinals and Wisconsin Badgers football teams
 Debbie McCormick, world champion curler, Olympic athlete
 Milton McPike, NFL player
 Walter Meanwell, former head coach of the Wisconsin Badgers men's basketball team, member of the Naismith Memorial Basketball Hall of Fame
 Bob Mionske, Olympic athlete
 Jim Montgomery, world champion swimmer, Olympic gold medalist, member of the International Swimming Hall of Fame
 Eric Morel, boxer, former WBA Flyweight champion.
 Peter Mueller, Olympic speed skater
 Pat Neshek, MLB player
 Rick Neuheisel, NFL player, former head coach of the UCLA Bruins football team
 Kid Nichols, member of the Baseball Hall of Fame
 Andy North, professional golfer
 Jay Norvell, NFL player, head coach of the Nevada Wolf Pack football team
 Jeff Nygaard, Olympic athlete
 Karl Pagel, MLB player
 Bill Reay, NHL player and head coach
 Rick Reichardt, MLB player
 Andrew Rein, Olympic wrestler, winner of a silver medal
 Barry Richter, hockey player
 Pat Richter, NFL player, member of the College Football Hall of Fame, athletic director of the University of Wisconsin–Madison
 Libby Riddles, first woman to win the Iditarod Trail Sled Dog Race
 Michelle Rohl, Olympic athlete, Pan American Games medalist
 Dan Schachte, former NHL official
 Nick Schmaltz, NHL player
 Pete Schmitt, NFL player
 Jack Skille, right winger for the Rockford IceHogs of the AHL
 Shaka Smart, head coach of the Texas Longhorns men's basketball team
Craig Smith, NHL player
 Zane Smith, MLB player
 Chris Solinsky, professional runner
 Bill Southworth, MLB player
 Dave Stalls, NFL player
 Derek Stanley, NFL player
 Ken Starch, NFL player
 Sherri Steinhauer, LPGA player
 Lisa Stone, head coach of the Wisconsin Badgers women's basketball team
 Tim Stracka, NFL player
 Steve Stricker, professional golfer
 Eric Studesville, head coach of the Denver Broncos in the NFL
 Bob Suter, 1980 Miracle on Ice USA Olympic hockey team gold medalist
 Gary Suter, retired NHL player
 Ryan Suter, NHL player
 Lindsay Tarpley, WPS player
 Matt Tegenkamp, professional distance runner
 Donnel Thompson, NFL player
 Al Toon, former professional football player
 Stu Voigt, NFL player
 Jack Waite, professional tennis player
 Pete Waite, head coach of the Wisconsin Badgers women's volleyball team
 Lisa Wang, national champion rhythmic gymnast
 Henry Willegale, NFL player
 Brad Winchester, NHL player
 Ari Wolfe, sports announcer
 Tony Yelk, NFL player
 Jackie Zoch, Olympic medalist

Business and industry figures

 Noah Dietrich, CEO of the majority of enterprises owned by Howard Hughes, including RKO Pictures, Trans World Airlines, and Hughes Aircraft
 Judith R. Faulkner, CEO and founder of Epic Systems
 John Geisse, founder of Target Corporation
 Burton E. Green, one of the developers of Beverly Hills, California
 Alex Jordan, Jr., businessman, architect
Peter Koechley, co-founder of Upworthy and former managing editor of The Onion
 Jim Lillie, CEO of Jarden Corporation; spent a part of his childhood and attended the UW '83
 Oscar G. Mayer, Jr., Chairman of Oscar Mayer
 Oscar G. Mayer, Sr., Chairman of Oscar Mayer
 Odessa Piper, chef and co-founder of the restaurant L'Etoile
 Pleasant Rowland, businesswoman, creator of the American Girl product line

Entertainers

Actors, radio personalities, and filmmakers

 Andrea Anders, actress, comedian
 Randy Chestnut, comedian, actor, 17-year resident of Madison
 Michael Cole, actor
 Tyne Daly, Emmy and Tony Award-winning actress
 Melvyn Douglas, Academy Award-winning actor
 Chris Farley, actor, comedian, grew up in Madison
 John P. Farley, actor and comedian
 Kevin Farley, actor
 Michael Feldman, radio personality for Public Radio International
 Nick Grinde (1893–1979), film director and screenwriter
 Uta Hagen, actress, recipient of the National Medal of Arts
 Kurt Johnson, radio personality, director for RKO, CBS, Viacom and others
 Nietzchka Keene, filmmaker
 Imran Khan, Bollywood actor
 Russ Lieber, fictitious character from The Colbert Report with a liberal radio talk show supposedly based in Madison
 Rob Marshall, Academy Award-nominated director
 Sandra Nelson, actress
 Chris Noth, actor, born in Madison
 Zorba Paster, radio show host
 Bill Rebane, filmmaker
 Ann Risley, actress
 Gena Rowlands, Oscar-nominated, Golden Globe and Emmy-winning actress
 Matt Sloan, voice actor, comedian
 Mary Sweeney, film editor and producer, partner of director David Lynch
 J.D. Walsh, actor
 Marc Webb, film, television, and music video director
 Bradley Whitford, actor, born in Madison
 Gideon Yago, CBS and MTV News correspondent
 Leigh Zimmerman, actress

Musicians

 Brother Ali, hip hop musician
 Lou and Peter Berryman, musicians and songwriters
 Jeff Conrad, drummer of Phantom Planet
 Ted Park, hip hop musician
 DJ Pain, hip hop musician
 Yung Gravy, hip hop musician 
 Brent Michael Davids, composer for the National Symphony Orchestra
 Richard Davis, bassist and professor at the University of Wisconsin–Madison
 John DeMain, conductor
 Ari Herstand, musician, actor, blogger
 Nick Hexum, musician, lead vocalist of 311
 Lee Hoiby, composer
 Zola Jesus, musician; raised in Merrill and got her start in Madison
 Jennifer Korbee, member of Hi-5; contestant on American Idol
 Alicia Lemke, singer, famous for appearing on Matt Harding's Where the Hell is Matt? 2012 video
 Barbara K. MacDonald, musician
 Pat MacDonald, musician
 Joel McNeely, composer
 Tracy Nelson, singer
 Otis Redding, musician, died in Madison
 Art Paul Schlosser, musician
 Jim Schwall, musician, singer-songwriter
 Ben Sidran, musician, jazz pianist
 Catfish Stephenson, blues musician
 Clyde Stubblefield, musician, died in Madison
 Butch Vig, alternative music producer and drummer of Garbage; from Viroqua, got his start in Madison
 Chris Vrenna, musician and producer
 Jane Wiedlin, musician and actress
 Glenn Worf, Nashville session bass player
 Benjamin Foster also known as Ben Weasel lead singer and guitarist of the punk rock band Screeching Weasel.
 Geoff Palmer musician, singer, and songwriter. Member of The Connection, The Kurt Baker band, and The Queers

Government officials, politicians, and activists

 Stacey Abrams, Georgia State politician
 Henry Cullen Adams, U.S. Representative
 Rasmus B. Anderson, U.S. diplomat
 Dwight Armstrong (1951–2010), perpetrator of the Sterling Hall bombing
 David Atwood, Mayor of Madison, newspaper publisher/editor, U.S. Representative
 Tammy Baldwin, U.S. Senator
 George V. Borchsenius, first clerk of the court of the Nome judicial division of Alaska
 Dorothy Bradley, Montana state legislator
 John R. Burke, U.S. diplomat
 Michael J. Cantwell, Wisconsin State Assemblyman
 Richard Cates, Wisconsin legislator and lawyer
 William Charlton, Wisconsin State Assemblyman and farmer
 Liz Cheney, U.S. Representative from Wyoming
 Jason Crow, U.S. Representative from Colorado
 Leo Crowley, head of the Foreign Economic Administration
 Dexter Curtis, Wisconsin legislator and inventor
 Joseph E. Davies, U.S. diplomat
 Abiol Lual Deng, South Sudanese-American political scientist
 Brian Detter, Navy official, activist
 Jim Doyle, Governor of Wisconsin 2003–2011
 Scott Evertz, first openly gay director of the Office of National AIDS Policy
 William T. Evjue, Wisconsin State Assemblyman; founder of The Capital Times
 Lucius Fairchild, U.S. diplomat
 Thomas E. Fairchild, Chief Judge of the U.S. Court of Appeals
 Leonard J. Farwell, Governor of Wisconsin
 Louis E. Gettle, politician
 John D. Gurnee, Wisconsin State Assembly
 Everis A. Hayes, U.S. Representative from California
 Charles N. Herreid, Governor of South Dakota
 Charles W. Heyl, Wisconsin State Assembly
 Benjamin F. Hopkins, U.S. Representative
 Burr W. Jones, U.S. Representative
 Philip Mayer Kaiser, diplomat
 Scott L. Klug, U.S. Representative 1991-1999
 Randall S. Knox, lawyer, politician, businessman
 Kris Kobach, professor, politician
 Thomas F. Konop, U.S. Representative
 Clifford Krueger, politician
 Julius Albert Krug, U.S. Secretary of the Interior
 Belle Case La Follette, activist
 Bronson La Follette, Wisconsin Attorney General
 Doug La Follette, Wisconsin Secretary of State, environmental activist, writer
 Fola La Follette, activist
 Philip La Follette, Governor of Wisconsin
 Robert M. La Follette, Jr., U.S. Senator
 Robert M. La Follette, Sr., populist, senator, attorney
 Francis Lamb, politician and lawyer
 Richard Lamm, Governor of Colorado
 James B. Loken, Judge of the U.S. Court of Appeals
 Willett Main, Wisconsin State Senator
 Cheri Maples, Wisconsin lawyer, police officer, and peace activist
 Ben Masel, original Yippee, hemp and marijuana legalization activist
 Teresa McGovern, daughter of presidential candidate George McGovern
 Wayne L. Morse, U.S. Senator from Oregon
 Earl Mullen, politician and barber
 Gaylord Nelson, U.S. Senator, founder of Earth Day
 John M. Nelson, U.S. Representative
 William Proxmire, U.S. Senator
 Charles R. Robertson, U.S. Representative from North Dakota
 Harry Sauthoff, lawyer and politician
 Albert G. Schmedeman, U.S. diplomat
 Stuart Nash Scott, U.S. diplomat
 Ithamar Sloan, U.S. Representative
 Paul Soglin, Mayor 1973–1979, 1989–1997, 2011–2019
 John Coit Spooner, U.S. Senator
 John Mellen Thurston, U.S. Senator from Nebraska; namesake of Thurston County, Nebraska
 Marjorie R. Turnbull, Florida State Representative
 William F. Vilas, U.S. Postmaster General and U.S. Secretary of the Interior
 Floyd E. Wheeler, Wisconsin State Assembly
 William Wheeler, Wisconsin territorial legislator
 Frank E. Wheelock, a founder and first mayor of Lubbock, Texas; reared in Madison
 Rebecca Young, Wisconsin State Assembly

Military figures

 George E. Bryant, U.S. Army Brigadier General
 Joseph Cable, Medal of Honor recipient
 Charles L. Harris, Union Army Brigadier General
 Frank A. Haskell, Union Army colonel; author of a noted account of the Battle of Gettysburg
 William Hawley, Union Army Brigadier General
 John Higgins, U.S. Navy Rear Admiral (Upper Half)
 Donald S. Jones, U.S. Navy Vice Admiral
 William Lorenz, Army Distinguished Service Medal recipient
 John Birdsell Oren, U.S. Coast Guard Rear Admiral
 Carson Abel Roberts, U.S. Marine Corps Lieutenant General
 Clayton K. Slack, Medal of Honor recipient
 Eugene L. Tattini, U.S. Air Force Lieutenant General
 Albert Taubert, Navy Cross and Distinguished Service Cross recipient
 Karl G. Taylor, Sr., Medal of Honor recipient
 Ralph Wise Zwicker, U.S. Army Major General

Miscellaneous
 Dwight Armstrong, took part in the Sterling Hall bombing in 1970
 Carlo Peter Caputo, alleged Italian American gangster and businessman
 Bill Horstmeyer, race car driver
 Awonder Liang, chess prodigy, 2nd youngest Grandmaster in US chess history
 Sterling Long-Colbo, espionage entertainment entrepreneur
 Richard Ragsdale, physician who litigated against excessive abortion regulation

Religious figures

 Matthew Fox, Episcopal priest
 Jerome J. Hastrich, Bishop of the Roman Catholic Diocese of Gallup
 Hans Gerhard Stub, Bishop of the Norwegian Lutheran Church of America
 Manfred Swarsensky, rabbi

Scholars and scientists

 Ann Althouse, law professor, scholar and blogger
 John Bardeen, Nobel laureate, named one of the 20th century's most influential Americans by Life magazine
 Arthur Louis Breslich, President of German Wallace College and Baldwin-Wallace College
 Ernest J. Briskey, creator of the American Meat Science Association
 W. Wallace Cleland, University of Wisconsin–Madison biochemist; inventor of Cleland's reagent
 Scott Cutlip, dean of the University of Georgia College of Journalism and Mass Communication
 Richard Davidson, neuroscientist, director of the Center for Investigating Healthy Minds University of Wisconsin–Madison
 Hector DeLuca, biochemist and founder and president of Deltanoid Pharmaceuticals
 Harvey Goldberg, historian and professor
 Harlan Hanson, Director of the Advanced Placement program from 1965 to 1989
 Howard Hibbard, art historian, professor at Columbia University
 John Duer Irving, geologist
 Aldo Leopold, ecologist
 A. Carl Leopold, Graduate Dean at the University of Nebraska-Lincoln
 A. Starker Leopold, Professor of Zoology and Conservation at the University of California, Berkeley
 Luna Leopold, Professor of Geology and Geophysics and of Landscape Architecture at the University of California, Berkeley
 William Shainline Middleton, co-founder and Secretary-Treasurer of American Board of Internal Medicine
 George Mosse, historian, professor
 John Muir, Scottish-born American naturalist, author and early advocate of preservation of U.S. wilderness
 Gerhard Brandt Naeseth, genealogist
 Lorrie Otto, environmentalist
 Leon E. Rosenberg, physician-scientist, geneticist, and educator
 Jay P. Sanford, author of the Sanford Guide to Antimicrobial Therapy
 Sumner Slichter, economist, professor at Harvard University
 Kurt Squire, director of the Games, Learning & Society Conference
 Harry Steenbock, biochemist, researcher of Vitamin D
 James Thomson, leading stem cell researcher
 Jan Vansina, historian and anthropologist
 I. Bernard Weinstein, physician
 Ira Loren Wiggins, botanist
 James Wright, President of Dartmouth College

Writers and journalists

 Carl Thomas Anderson, cartoonist
 Mike Baron, comic book writer famous for creating Nexus
 Lowell Bergman, TV news producer
 Deborah Blum, journalist and professor
 Barbara Fister, author, blogger and librarian
 Jason Gastrow, Videogamedunkey, video game reviewer, humorist, YouTube personality
 Annie Laurie Gaylor, author and activist with Freethought Today
 Jeff Gillan, journalist
 Kevin Henkes, children's book author, graduated from UW–Madison and as of 1996 "makes his home in Madison."
 Ed Janus, journalist
 Gloria Ladson-Billings, professor and author
 David Maraniss, journalist and author, recipient of the Pulitzer Prize
 Karl E. Meyer, journalist
 Jacquelyn Mitchard, author
 Lorrie Moore, prize-winning author of short stories
 Jessica Nelson North, author
 Alice Hobbins Porter, journalist, editor
 Richard Quinney, author and photographer
 John E. Roach, author and co-writer (along with Mary Sweeney, ex-Madisonian and wife of David Lynch) of the film The Straight Story
 Phil Rosenthal (columnist), columnist
 Patrick Rothfuss, writer of epic fantasy
 Greg Dean Schmitz, online film journalist, creator of Upcomingmovies.com, columnist for Rotten Tomatoes
 Alice Sebold, author
 Scott Stantis, editorial cartoonist for the Chicago Tribune; creator of the comic strips The Buckets and Prickly City
 Connie Wanek, poet
 Ella Wheeler Wilcox, poet ("Laugh and the world laughs with you"); grew up in Madison
 Amos Wilder, poet and theologian
 Thornton Wilder, Pulitzer Prize-winning novelist and playwright

See also
 List of University of Wisconsin–Madison people

References

Madison
 
Madison, Wisconsin